Tadikona is a village in Allavaram Mandal, Dr. B.R. Ambedkar Konaseema district in the state of Andhra Pradesh in India.

Geography 

Demographics 
 India census, Tadikona had a population of 1662, out of which 832 were male and 830 were female. The population of children below 6 years of age was 10%. The literacy rate of the village was 76%.

References 

Villages in Allavaram mandal